Xingtai, formerly known as Xingzhou and Shunde, is a prefecture-level city in southern Hebei province, People's Republic of China. At the 2020 census, its population was 7,111,106 inhabitants. It borders Shijiazhuang and Hengshui in the north, Handan in the south, and the provinces of Shandong and Shanxi in the east and west respectively.

History
Xingtai is the oldest city in North China. The history of Xingtai can be traced back 3500 years ago. During the Shang Dynasty, Xingtai functioned as a capital city. During the Zhou Dynasty, the State of Xingfrom which the present name deriveswas founded in the city. During the Warring States period, the state of Zhao made Xingtai its provisional capital. The city was known as Xindu for most of the Qin Dynasty, but after the 207 BC Battle of Julu (within present-day Pingxiang County, not today's Julu County), it became known as Xiangguo. During the Sixteen Kingdoms Period, when the Later Zhao was founded by Shi Le of the Jie, the capital was again at Xiangguo. During the Sui and Tang dynasties, the city was known as Xingzhou.

Sui, Tang and Song times saw the zenith of ceramics production in what was the most prolific ceramics center of northern China (rivaling the Yue ware from the South). The white ware and new technologies developed in the Xing kiln mark the transition from proto-porcelain to proper porcelain. More than thirty kiln site have been excavated in different subdivisions of today's Xingtai City and a large high-tech museum have been established in Neiqiu County in 2017.

During the Yuan Dynasty, Ming, and Qing dynasties, Xingtai was called Shunde (Shundefu) and functioned as a prefecture in China.

Geography and climate
Xingtai has a continental, monsoon-influenced semi-arid climate (Köppen BSk). It has hot, humid summers due to the East Asian monsoon, and generally cold, windy, very dry winters that reflect the influence of the vast Siberian anticyclone; fall is similar to spring both in temperature and lack of rainfall. In the spring, there are large sandstorms blowing in from the Mongolian steppe, accompanied by rapidly warming, but generally dry, conditions. The annual rainfall, more than half of which falls in July and August alone, is highly variable and not reliable.

Air quality

According to a survey made by "Global voices China" in February 2013, 7 cities in Hebei including Xingtai, Shijiazhuang, Baoding, Handan, Langfang, Hengshui and Tangshan, were among China's 10 most polluted cities; Xingtai ranked 1st in the list and had the worst air quality. In 2020, the improvement rates of Xingtai's comprehensive air quality index and PM2.5 average concentration ranked first in Hebei Province. The average annual concentration of PM2.5 has successfully withdrawn from the "top ten" in China.

Xingtai earthquake
A major earthquake, known as the Xingtai earthquake, with magnitude 6.8 on the Richter scale and epicenter in Longyao County occurred in the early morning of March 8, 1966. It was followed by 5 earthquakes above magnitude 6 on the Richter scale that lasted until March 29, 1966. The strongest of these quakes had a magnitude of 7.2 and took place in the southeastern part of Ningjin County on March 22. The earthquake damage included 8,064 dead, 38,000 injured and more than 5 million destroyed houses.

Administrative divisions

Xingtai Economic Development Area and Xingdong New Area belong to Xiangdu District.
Xingtai County - defunct

Economy
Xingtai is the most important base for natural resources in North China, producing 20 million metric tonnes of coal annually. It also features the largest power plant in the southern part of this region of China, with an output of 2.06 GW.

Transport
Located on the Beijing−Guangzhou, the Beijing−Kowloon, the Xingtai-Huanghua and Xingtai-Heshun Railways, as well as the Beijing−Shenzhen, Daqing-Guangzhou, Taihangshan, Xingtai-Hengshui, Qingdao−Yinchuan, and Dongying-Lvliang Expressways and Xingtai Dalian Airport. Xingtai is a transport hub connecting the Eastern, Northern, and Central China.

Notable persons
 Ren Xuefeng
 Hebei Pangzai
 Wei Lijie
Guo Shoujing
Liu Bingzhong
Song Jing
Chai Rong
Seng Yixing

See also
Beiguozhuang

References

External links

 Xingtai gov.cn Online

 
Cities in Hebei
Prefecture-level divisions of Hebei